Woodman Junior High School is a major junior high school for S.W. Calgary, Alberta, Canada, accepting 5th, 6th, 7th, 8th, and 9th graders. The school was built in 1959, and the current principal is Marlene Krickhan.

Name 
The school was named after Mr. FL Woodman (1888-1967), a teacher with the Calgary Board of Education from 1915-1935 and the principal of Western Canada High School from 1935-1954. He was awarded the Calgary Sportsman of the Year, and the Calgary Booster Club described Mr. Woodman as a legend who made amateur sport a reality by his hard  work and dedication.

Programs

Athletics 
Students can try out for a number of sports, including:

 Cross Country (no cut varsity team)
 Volleyball (junior development team, senior girls and boys)
 Wrestling (no cut varsity team)
 Basketball (girls and boys senior, junior development team)
 Badminton (junior 6/7, intermediate 8, senior 9; junior development team)
 Track and Field (junior varsity 6, junior 7, intermediate 8, senior 9)

Music 
Music is a required course for students in grades 5-6, and is an optional class for grades 7-9. Junior Band begins in grade 7, and Senior Band begins in grade 8.

Lunchtime 
There is supervised lunchtime for grades 5-6, who are given access to the school's upper field. The school is an open campus for grades 7-9, with several options for food available around Elbow Drive and Heritage Drive. There is no lunchtime options available in school (with the exception of the Healthy Hunger program, in which students can pre-order food from various establishments), though there are vending machines providing healthy snacks and drinks within the building.

Transportation 

Though many students walk to school, the yellow school bus is available for students not living within the walk zone- this bus is administered by Southland Transportation. The school is also located near several Calgary Transit bus stops, and is an approximately 14 minute walk from Heritage station (Calgary), located on the CTrain's Red Line.

References

Middle schools in Calgary
Educational institutions established in 1959
1959 establishments in Alberta